The Gosselin River (in French: rivière Gosselin) is a tributary of Nicolet River passing through Saint-Norbert-d'Arthabaska, Saint-Christophe d'Arthabaska and Victoriaville, in the regional county municipality (MRC) of Arthabaska Regional County Municipality, in the administrative region of Centre-du-Québec, in Quebec, in Canada.

The Gosselin River sometimes flows in agricultural, forest and urban areas.

Geography 

The neighboring watersheds of the Gosselin River are:
 north side: Bulstrode River, l'Abbé River, Lachance River;
 east side: Gobeil stream;
 south side: Nicolet River, Roux stream, Brooks River;
 west side: Nicolet River.

The Gosselin River takes its source from a small lake located to the east of the Arthabaska sector of the city of Victoriaville and to the east of Mont Saint-Michel.

  northward, to the confluence of Houle brook;
  southwesterly, to the confluence of the Lachance River;
  southwesterly, crossing the Arthabaska sector of the city of Victoriaville, to route 116;
  towards the southwest, until its confluence.
Note: The course of the Gosselin river completely bypasses Mont Saint-Michel on the north side.

The mouth of the Gosselin River flows onto the north shore of the Nicolet River. Its confluence is located in the south-central part of the city of Victoriaville, on the west side of route 116 and north of avenue Pie-X.

Toponymy 
The toponym Rivière Gosselin was formalized on December 5, 1968, at the Place Names Bank of the Commission de toponymie du Québec.

See also 
 List of rivers of Quebec

References 

Arthabaska Regional County Municipality
Gosselin